The Natranaerobiaceae are a family of bacteria placed within the class Clostridia. This family contains the thermophilic bacterial species Natranaerobius thermophilus and the related species Natranaerobaculum magadiense.

Phylogeny

See also
 List of bacteria genera
 List of bacterial orders

References 

Natranaerobiales